Hogupo Station is a station on the Suin Line as a part of the Seoul Metropolitan Subway system as of June 30, 2012. It is located in Nonhyeon-dong, Namdong-gu, Incheon.

It was an abandoned railway station as Nonhyeon Station. It opened in 1967 and closed in the 1970s.

References

Metro stations in Incheon
Railway stations opened in 1937
Seoul Metropolitan Subway stations
Namdong District